James Dyer (1510–1582) was a judge and Speaker of the House of Commons.

James Dyer may also refer to:
James E. Dyer (1946–2011), American politician
James Dyer (cricketer) (1809–1876), English cricketer
Jimmy Dyer (1883–1971), footballer
Jim Dyer, member of the Colorado Senate from the 26th district, followed by Steve Ward
James Dyer, a character in Londyńczycy

See also
John James Dyer (1809–1855), United States federal judge in Iowa